Javier Alexis Guerra  (born September 25, 1995) is a Panamanian professional baseball pitcher for the Milwaukee Brewers of Major League Baseball (MLB). Guerra began his career as an infielder, reaching MLB as such in 2018 with the San Diego Padres, before converting to pitching in 2019. He has also played in MLB for the Tampa Bay Rays.

Professional career

Boston Red Sox
Guerra signed as a shortstop with the Boston Red Sox as an international free agent in 2012, coming to terms on a contract calling for a reported signing bonus of $250,000. At the time Guerra drew mixed reviews for his defense because he had fringy speed, but he showed a very quick first step and excellent range to both sides. He had very soft but quick hands and was assured in the field, which complemented his arm, perhaps the strongest in the Red Sox system.

Guerra made his professional debut with the Rookie league Dominican Summer League Red Sox in 2013, hitting .248/.356/.290 with nine doubles and 23 runs batted in in 60 games. He then played for the Rookie league Gulf Coast Red Sox in 2014, batting .269/.286/.408 with two home runs and 26 RBI in the Gulf Coast League.

He had a breakout season with the Class A Greenville Drive in 2015, where he displayed highlight-reel defensive plays at shortstop with the ability to drive the ball. Guerra put up a .279/.329/.449 slash line with 68 RBI, along with 23 doubles, three triples and 15 home runs in a career-high 116 games, while earning a selection to the South Atlantic League All-Star Game. In addition, Guerra ranked among the best hitters in the Red Sox system, ending second in home runs, third in RBI and total bases (195), fourth in slugging (.449) and fifth in runs scored (64). On defense, he made 27 errors at shortstop, and had a .954 fielding percentage.

San Diego Padres
On November 13, 2015, the Red Sox traded Guerra, Carlos Asuaje, Manuel Margot, and Logan Allen to the San Diego Padres for Craig Kimbrel. He spent 2016 with the Class A-Advanced Lake Elsinore Storm, where he batted .202/.264/.325 with nine home runs and 41 RBIs in 105 games, as on defense he made 30 errors at shortstop and had a .940 fielding percentage. The Padres added him to their 40-man roster after the 2016 season.

He spent 2017 with Lake Elsinore and the Class AA San Antonio Missions, batting .222/.266/.349 with nine home runs and 53 RBIs in 128 games between both teams. He began 2018 with the Class AAA El Paso Chihuahuas, for whom he batted .223/.269/.398 in 122 games. Through 2018, in 582 minor league games he had batted .237/.290/.374, while playing nearly all the games at shortstop.

Guerra was called up to the majors for the first time on May 4, 2018 and made his MLB debut that night. In 16 at-bats in 2018 with the Padres, he batted .125 with one RBI.

Conversion to pitcher
During 2019 spring training, Guerra was converted into a relief pitcher. Guerra opened the season on the injured list due to an oblique injury. After being activated, he was assigned to Lake Elsinore. He was promoted to the Amarillo Sod Poodles on August 20. On September 1, Guerra was promoted to the major leagues as a pitcher for the first time.

In 2020, Guerra pitched to a 1-0 record with a 10.13 ERA and 12 strikeouts in 13.1 innings of work across 14 appearances. On April 5, 2021, Guerra was placed on the 60-day injured list with a grade 1 UCL sprain. On September 21, Guerra was activated off of the injured list.

On April 13, 2022, Guerra was designated for assignment by the Padres following the waiver claim of Kyle Tyler. He had allowed four runs in 2.0 innings pitched two days prior against the Arizona Diamondbacks in his only appearance of the season.

Tampa Bay Rays
On April 16, 2022, the Padres traded Guerra to the Tampa Bay Rays for cash considerations. He pitched to an 8.44 ERA across six appearances for the Rays before he was designated for assignment on May 1. On May 6, Guerra cleared waivers and was outrighted to the Durham Bulls. He was promoted back to the active roster on June 30, 2022. He was returned to Triple-A on July 4, 2022. He had his contract selected on September 12. On November 15, Guerra was designated for assignment.

Milwaukee Brewers
On November 18, 2022, the Rays traded Guerra to the Milwaukee Brewers in exchange for a player to be named later.

International career
On August 13, 2022, Guerra was named as part of the Panama national baseball team roster for the 2023 World Baseball Classic qualifiers, to be played at Estadio Nacional Rod Carew in Panama City.

References

External links

1995 births
Living people
Amarillo Sod Poodles players
Dominican Summer League Red Sox players
El Paso Chihuahuas players
Greenville Drive players
Gulf Coast Red Sox players
Lake Elsinore Storm players
Major League Baseball pitchers
Major League Baseball players from Panama
Major League Baseball shortstops
Major League Baseball third basemen
Panamanian expatriate baseball players in the Dominican Republic
Panamanian expatriate baseball players in the United States
People from David District
Peoria Javelinas players
San Diego Padres players
San Antonio Missions players
Tampa Bay Rays players
Durham Bulls players
Leones del Escogido players
2023 World Baseball Classic players